1976 Paralympics refers to both:
1976 Summer Paralympics
1976 Winter Paralympics